Iago Indias Fernández (born 3 January 1996) is a Spanish professional footballer who plays for CD Castellón. Mainly a central defender, he can also play as a right back.

Club career
Born in Vigo, Galicia, Indias represented CF Sant Andreu de la Barca and FC Santboià before joining RCD Espanyol's youth setup in 2010. He made his senior debut with the reserves on 8 November 2014, coming on as a late substitute for goalscorer Jairo Morillas in a 2–0 Segunda División B home win against Gimnàstic de Tarragona.

Indias scored his first senior goal on 10 March 2019, netting the opener in a 4–0 home routing of UB Conquense. On 7 June, he renewed his contract until 2021.

Indias terminated his contract with the Pericos on 24 August 2020, and signed a two-year contract with Segunda División newcomers CD Castellón just hours later. He made his professional debut on 7 December, replacing Marc Mateu in a 1–3 away loss against RCD Mallorca.

References

External links

1994 births
Living people
Spanish footballers
Footballers from Vigo
Association football defenders
Segunda División players
Primera Federación players
Segunda División B players
Tercera División players
RCD Espanyol B footballers
CD Castellón footballers
CE Sabadell FC footballers